Billy Shearman was an English footballer who played in the Football League for Nottingham Forest.

He scored on his debut for Nottingham Forest on 3 October 1903 in the away match against Sheffield Wednesday. His last game for Forest was on 12 December 1908 in the 1-1 draw at home to Preston North End. He was the highest scorer for Forest in the 1904-05 season with 13 league goals.

Shearman went on the Nottingham Forest tour of Uruguay and Argentina in 1905. He played in all 8 games and scored in 7 of them with a total 13 goals.

Career Statistics

References

English footballers
Association football forwards
English Football League players
Nottingham Forest F.C. players